Mirko Milićević (born  August 2, 1965) is a Serbian-Turkish retired professional basketball player. He holds Turkish citizenship, under the name of Muhammet Onar.

Personal life 
His son, Yesukan Onar, is also a basketball player.

References

External links
TBLStat.net Profile

1965 births
Living people
AEK B.C. players
Apollon Patras B.C. players
CB Valladolid players
Hapoel Jerusalem B.C. players
Karşıyaka basketball players
KK Crvena zvezda players
KK Cibona players
KK Vojvodina players
Serbian expatriate basketball people in Croatia
Serbian expatriate basketball people in Greece
Serbian expatriate basketball people in Israel
Serbian expatriate basketball people in Italy
Serbian expatriate basketball people in Spain
Serbian expatriate basketball people in Turkey
Serbian men's basketball players
Türk Telekom B.K. players
Turkish expatriate basketball people in Serbia
Turkish people of Serbian descent
Yugoslav men's basketball players
Centers (basketball)
Medalists at the 1987 Summer Universiade
Universiade gold medalists for Yugoslavia
Universiade medalists in basketball